Robert M. Chadwick (November 23, 1833 – April 21, 1902) was an American politician from Pennsylvania who served as a Republican member of the Pennsylvania House of Representatives for Delaware County from 1881 to 1888.

Early life
Chadwick was born in Rochdale, England to Thomas and Sarah (Crabtree) Chadwick.  His family emigrated to the United States in 1847 and settled in Upland, Pennsylvania. He was educated in the public schools of Upland and then learned the wheelwright trade in Frankford, Pennsylvania. He served as a private in Company I of the 114th Pennsylvania Volunteer Infantry Regiment (known as the Collis Zouaves) of the Union Army from 1862 to 1865 during the American Civil War.  In 1866, he moved to Chester, Pennsylvania and established a wagon factory and blacksmith shop at the corner of Third and Fulton Streets.

Career
Chadwick was elected to the Chester City Council and served from 1877 to 1882.  He was elected to the Pennsylvania House of Representatives for Delaware County and served from 1881 to 1888.  He was not a candidate for reelection in 1888.

Chadwick was a member of the board of trustees of the Soldiers' Home at Erie, Pennsylvania for two years.  He worked as postmaster for the United States Postal Service for the Chester post office from 1889 to 1894.

Personal life

In 1857, Chadwick married Louisa J. Gardner and together they had six children.  He was a member of the Wilde Post, No. 25 Grand Army of the Republic, the Union Veteran League, Chester Lodge No. 235 Free and Accepted Masons, Chester Chapter No. 258 of the Royal Arch Masons, St. John Commandery No. 3 Knights Templar of Philadelphia and the Odd Fellows.

Chadwick died in Chester, Pennsylvania and was interred at Chester Rural Cemetery.

References

1834 births
1902 deaths
19th-century American politicians
American Freemasons
Burials at Chester Rural Cemetery
Republican Party members of the Pennsylvania House of Representatives
Pennsylvania city council members
Pennsylvania postmasters
People from Chester, Pennsylvania
People of Pennsylvania in the American Civil War
British emigrants to the United States
Union Army soldiers